Siyahtan (also Romanized as Sīyāhtan) is a village in Tulem Rural District, Tulem District, Sowme'eh Sara County, Gilan Province, Iran. At the 2006 census, its population was 493, in 155 families.

References 

Populated places in Sowme'eh Sara County